Andrew Yogan (born December 4, 1991) is an American professional ice hockey player currently playing for Graz99ers of the ICE Hockey League.

He was selected by the New York Rangers in the 4th round (100th overall) of the 2010 NHL Entry Draft. He was the first hockey player raised in Florida to be drafted by the NHL.  Prior NHL players who were born in Florida, but raised elsewhere include Val James, Dallas Eakins, Dan Hinote, and Blake Geoffrion.

Playing career
Yogan played major junior hockey in the Ontario Hockey League.  He was originally drafted by the Windsor Spitfires in 2007 in the 5th round of the OHL draft.  He had been ranked 19th in the draft but fell because teams were concerned he was not interested in joining the OHL. He joined the Erie Otters in 2008. In the 2008–09 season, prior to becoming draft eligible, he suffered a concussion which may have caused him to slip in the draft.  Prior to the concussion, some analysts considered him a potential first round draft pick.  In 2009-10, Yogan scored 25 goals and 30 assists for 55 points for Erie.  In 2010–11, he missed all but 10 games and the playoffs due to a shoulder injury.  He was traded to the Peterborough Petes in 2011.

For the 2011–12 season, Yogan was named OHL player of the week for the week of March 12–18, 2012, during which he scored four goals and four assists for eight points with a +8 plus-minus rating in his last three OHL games.  For the season, Yogan finished 6th in the OHL with 41 goals and 15th in the OHL with 78 points.  Yogan also believes that he made significant improvements in his defensive skills during the season.

On March 21, 2012, the Connecticut Whale signed Yogan to an American Hockey League amateur tryout agreement, and on March 26, 2012, Yogan was signed by the New York Rangers to a three-year two-way contract.  He played two games for the Whale in 2011, scoring two goals and one assist.  Both goals came in his pro debut on April 9, 2011.

At the time he was drafted, Yogan regarded his hands and his shot as his best assets as a hockey player, and his speed as the biggest issue he needed to develop. His lack of speed may have been the result of starting playing hockey later than most legitimate prospects.

On October 6, 2014 he was traded from the Rangers to the Florida Panthers organization along with Steven Kampfer in exchange for Joey Crabb.

On September 10, 2015, Yogan returned to continue in the ECHL in signing a one-year contract with the Cincinnati Cyclones.

After his fourth full professional year in North America, Yogan opted to pursue a European career, agreeing to a one-year contract with Italian club, HC Bolzano, who compete in the Austrian Hockey League on July 25, 2016. After 10 games with Bolzano, Yogan left to rejoin the Cincinnati Cyclones on October 18, 2016. In the 2016–17 season, Yogan continued to prove his offensive prowess in the ECHL, collecting 15 goals and 32 points in 30 games. On February 2, 2017, he returned to the EBEL to continue with HC Bolzano to fulfil his contract obligations.

Career statistics

Regular season and playoffs

Awards and honors

References

External links

1991 births
Living people
American men's ice hockey centers
Bolzano HC players
Cincinnati Cyclones (ECHL) players
Connecticut Whale (AHL) players
Erie Otters players
Graz 99ers players
Greenville Road Warriors players
Sportspeople from Coral Springs, Florida
Hartford Wolf Pack players
Ice hockey people from Florida
Iowa Wild players
New York Rangers draft picks
HK Poprad players
St. John's IceCaps players
San Antonio Rampage players
HC Slovan Bratislava players
Syracuse Crunch players
Peterborough Petes (ice hockey) players
Windsor Spitfires players
People from Coconut Creek, Florida
American expatriate ice hockey players in Austria
American expatriate ice hockey players in Canada
American expatriate ice hockey players in Slovakia
American expatriate ice hockey players in Hungary
American expatriate ice hockey players in Italy